Anna Rust (born 3 May 1995) is an English actress and filmmaker. She began her career as a child actress in the ITV drama Doctor Zhivago (2002) and the film The Brothers Grimm (2005). She has since appeared in the Amazon Prime series Carnival Row (2019), the second season of Legends (2015), and the films Interlude in Prague (2017) and Ophelia (2018).

Early life 
Rust was born to British parents Will Rust, who works in advertising and branding, and Clare Bryant. She moved around growing up for her parents' work, living and attending international schools in the likes of Berlin, Budapest, and Kyiv; she can speak six languages as a result of her international childhood.

Career 
Rust made her television debut as Katya Antipova in the 2002 ITV miniseries adaptation of Doctor Zhivago and her film debut as Sister Grimm in the 2005 fantasy film The Brothers Grimm.

Rust later returned to acting, starring in the short film Bloody Weekend and The Missionary pilot in 2013 and make a guest appearance in an episode of the NBC series Crossing Lines in 2014. In 2015, Rust played Khava Bazaeva in the second season of the TNT series Legends. She starred in the 2017 film Interlude in Prague and 2018 film Ophelia.

In 2020, Rust played Fleury in Carnival Row, the Pix courtesan at Moira's brothel. In a red carpet interview, Rust told the Daily Express about her character: "There's a little bit of stigma around sex work generally and I think a lot of the time people are under the impression that you are only ever forced into it. I don't think there was a lot of choice for [Fleury] because all of the mythical creatures don't have many job opportunities but I don’t think it was something that she was entirely against, which I think is quite cool."

Rust made her directorial debut with Satiety, which screened at a number of film festivals and earned her a number of accolades, including Best Actress at the Venice Short Film Festival. She began production on it in March 2020, and resumed when COVID-19 lockdown restrictions were relaxed. She appeared in the 2021 HBO miniseries Scenes from a Marriage.

Rust has lent her voice to video games such as Final Fantasy XIV (voicing Gaia), Horizon Forbidden West, Cyberpunk 2077, Star Wars Battlefront 2, Nioh 2 and Battlefield V.

Personal life 
Rust is an outspoken activist for animal rights, LGBT representation, feminism, and diversity in film. Speaking about the importance of film and TV in making societal change, she said: "I’ve always said that film & TV – and games, for that matter – can change the world through exposure. And I really hope we can … continue to make change through art – be it destigmatize sex work, or dismantle racism, or getting people to be compassionate towards animals." She is pansexual.

She has spoken about her dream role being Marvel's Black Cat, as well as working in The Elder Scrolls series. She currently lives in London.

Filmography

Film

Television

Video games

Music videos
 "Straight Across The Sun" (2016)

References

External links 
 
 Unofficial fan page

Living people
1995 births
21st-century English actresses
English child actresses
English LGBT actors
English voice actresses
English women film directors
Pansexual actresses
People from the Royal Borough of Kingston upon Thames